was a town located in Setana District, Hiyama Subprefecture, Hokkaido, Japan.

As of 2004, the town had an estimated population of 5,908 and a density of 15.59 persons per km2. The total area was 379.03 km2.

On September 1, 2005, Kitahiyama, along with the town of Taisei (from Kudō District) was merged into the expanded town of Setana (formerly from Setana District, now in Kudō District).

Dissolved municipalities of Hokkaido